David Sharples  AKC (born  17 March 1958)  is the current Archdeacon of Rochdale and former Archdeacon of Salford.

He was educated at King's College London and ordained after a period of study at the College of the Resurrection, Mirfield in 1983. After a curacy at St Mary the Virgin, Prestwich he was Vicar of St Anne's, Royton from 1987 to 2002; and  Director of Ordinands for the Anglican Diocese of Manchester from 2002.

A keen supporter of Manchester City, he is married with two sons.

References

1958 births
Living people
Alumni of King's College London
Associates of King's College London
Alumni of the College of the Resurrection
Archdeacons of Salford
Archdeacons of Rochdale